The 2003 San Marino Grand Prix (formally the Gran Premio Foster's di San Marino 2003) was a Formula One motor race held on 20 April 2003 at the Autodromo Enzo e Dino Ferrari, Imola, Emilia-Romagna, Italy, with the race taking place on Easter Sunday. It was the fourth round of the 2003 Formula One season  The 62-lap race was won by Ferrari driver Michael Schumacher for the Ferrari team after starting from pole position. Kimi Räikkönen, driving for McLaren, finished second with Rubens Barrichello third in the other Ferrari. The remaining points-scoring positions were filled by Ralf Schumacher (Williams), David Coulthard (McLaren), Fernando Alonso (Renault), Juan Pablo Montoya (Williams) and Jenson Button (BAR). Schumacher's victory for Ferrari was his and the team's first of the season.

Schumacher and his brother Ralf raced despite the death of their mother Elisabeth before the Grand Prix. The brothers led the field at the start with Ralf leading having overtaken Michael and held the lead until the first round of pit stops.

As a consequence of the race, Räikkönen increased his lead in the World Drivers' Championship, over teammate David Coulthard to 13 points with Michael Schumacher climbing to third. In the World Constructors Championship, McLaren increased their lead to 19 points with Ferrari overtaking Renault for second.

Background
Heading into the fourth race of the season, McLaren driver Kimi Räikkönen was leading the World Drivers' Championship with 24 points, teammate David Coulthard was second on 15 points, 9 points behind Räikkönen. Behind Räikkönen and Coulthard in the Drivers' Championship, Fernando Alonso was third on 14 points in a Renault, with Giancarlo Fisichella and Jarno Trulli on 10 and 9 points respectively. In the World Constructors' Championship, McLaren were leading on 39 points and Renault were second on 23 points, with Ferrari on 16 points.

At the preceding Brazilian Grand Prix, confusion caused by a red flag at the end of the race led to Räikkönen being declared the winner. An investigation by Formula One's governing body the FIA in the days following the race proved that Fisichella had been the actual victor. The investigation discovered that Fisichella started his 56th lap when the red flag was shown and the results were rolled back to 54 laps. Under the countback rule, the driver leading two laps before a race is stopped is declared the winner. During a meeting organised by the teams, the countback rule would be placed under review having highlighted potential problems. Fifteen minutes before the start of the first practice session, a ceremony was held in which Räikkönen and McLaren team principal Ron Dennis presented their winners' trophies to Fisichella and Jordan team principal Eddie Jordan.

Ferrari originally planned to debut its new car the F2003-GA at Imola. However, issues with reliability led to the decision to race the F2002. Ferrari stated the F2002 was still a competitive car and believed racing the F2003-GA would be "risky" despite testing the car at Mugello and Fiorano.

Friday drivers 
The 3 teams in the 2003 Constructors' Championship had the right to drive a third car on Friday that were involved in additional training. These drivers did not compete in qualifying or the race.

Practice
Three practice sessions were held before the race; the first was held from 11:00 to 12:00 local time on Friday, and two 45 minute timed sessions were also held on Saturday from 09:00 to 09:45 and 10:15 to 11:00 local time. The Qualifying session was run as a one-lap session and took place on Friday and Saturday afternoon. The cars were run one at a time; the Friday running order was determined with the Championship leading heading out first. The Saturday running order was determined by times set in Friday afternoon qualifying with the fastest heading out last and the slowest running first. The lap times from the Friday afternoon session did not determine the grid order.

Williams drivers Ralf Schumacher and Juan Pablo Montoya set the pace in the Friday free practice, which took place in dry and sunny conditions, with a time of 1:21.335. Montoya was less than sixth hundredths of a second behind, ahead of Jaguar driver Mark Webber, Coulthard, Alonso and BAR driver Jenson Button. Michael Schumacher clipped the kerb at the Variante Bassa chicane, damaging the Ferrari's left rear suspension.

Qualifying
In the Saturday afternoon qualifying session, Schumacher clinched his second pole position of the season with a time of 1:22.327. He was joined on the front row by his brother Ralf Schumacher, who was 14 thousands of a seconds behind. Rubens Barrichello was third in the other Ferrari, with Montoya fourth. Webber took fifth, with Räikkönen taking sixth. Minardi driver Jos Verstappen crashed into the wall at the Variane Alta chicane becoming the first driver to not set a competitive lap time under the new qualifying format.

Qualifying classification

Race
The race took place in the afternoon and started at 14:00 local time, in dry and clear weather. As usual, the race was broadcast worldwide, with the "World Feed" coverage being produced by host broadcaster RAI. Michael Schumacher, from pole position on the grid, lost the lead from Ralf Schumacher before the first corner. Webber, from fifth, made a poor start dropping down to eleventh. Räikkonen managed to gain one position for fifth with teammate Coulthard making the best start and gained four places to go into eighth position. Webber's teammate Antônio Pizzonia stalled on the grid. Trackside marshals pushed Pizzonia's car to the exit of the pitlane where Jaguar mechanics managed to restart the car's engine enabling Pizzonia rejoin at the back of the field.

Post-race
Ralf and Michael Schumacher raced despite the death of their mother Elisabeth just hours before the race with the pair flying on a private jet to Cologne to be at her side. They sported black armbands and no champagne was sprayed on the podium as a mark of respect. Ralf also sported a black stripe on his racing helmet. The Schumacher brothers left the circuit immediately after the podium celebrations and Ferrari team principal Jean Todt took Michael's place at the post-race press conference. Race stewards Tony Scott-Andrews, Roger Peart and Giuseppe Musiconi formally excused the Schumacher brothers from the pre and post-race formalities.

At the subsequent post-race press conference, Todt revealed that Schumacher made the decision to compete in the Grand Prix with Ferrari giving their full support to Schumacher. Mercedes motorsport vice-president Norbert Haug expressed sympathy for the Schumacher brothers while also praising them for their performance during the race.

As a consequence of the race, Räikkönen increased his lead in the World Drivers' Championship, over teammate David Coulthard to 13 points with Schumacher climbing to third. In the World Constructors Championship, McLaren increased their lead to 16 points with Ferrari overtaking Renault for second.

Race classification

Championship standings after the race

Drivers' Championship standings

Constructors' Championship standings

Note: Only the top five positions are included for both sets of standings.

References

External links

San Marino Grand Prix
San Marino Grand Prix
San Marino Grand Prix
April 2003 sports events in Europe